X-Men: Evolution is an American animated television series about the Marvel Comics superhero team X-Men. In this incarnation, many of the characters are teenagers rather than adults. The series ran for a total of four seasons (52 episodes) from November 2000 until October 2003 on Kids' WB.

Series overview

Episodes

Season 1 (2000–2001)

Season 2 (2001–2002)
The Marvel YouTube page lists "Walk on the Wild Side" as episode 10 of season 2 (set before "Shadow Dance" because Blob still has his mohawk and Duncan gets tickets for Jean) while "On Angel's Wings" and "Operation Rebirth" are out of place, even though they may have aired on the supposed dates.

Season 3 (2002–2003)

Season 4 (2003)

References

External links
 X-Men: Evolution Episodes at Marvel.com
 TV.com: X-Men: Evolution episode list
 Toon Zone's X-Men: Evolution website
 X-Men: Evolution Page run by Kataclysm with screenshots for each episode and custom avatars

X-Men: Evolution
Evolution episodes
Episodes
X-Men